A Dirty Shame is a 2004 American satirical sex comedy film written and directed by John Waters and starring Tracey Ullman, Johnny Knoxville, Selma Blair, and Chris Isaak.

A Dirty Shame is currently the last film directed by Waters, who said that the film's poor box office performance had prevented him from making more films.

Plot
The people of Harford Road are firmly divided into two camps: the neuters, the puritanical residents who despise anything even remotely carnal; and the perverts, a group of sex addicts whose unique fetishes have all been brought to the fore by accidental concussions.

Repressed Sylvia Stickles finds herself firmly entrenched in the former camp. One day, after leaving her promiscuous daughter Caprice (nicknamed Ursula Udders because of gargantuan breasts and a penchant for indecent exposure while dancing at a local dive bar) locked up over the garage, under house arrest "for her own good", Sylvia is smacked on the head by a passing car and meets Ray-Ray Perkins, a local mechanic and self-styled "sex saint" who opens her mind to a whole new world of sensual pleasure, as he and his followers search for the ultimate sex act.

Eventually, through a series of bizarre head knockings, everyone in the Harford Road area of Baltimore becomes a sex addict, as Ray-Ray shoots semen out of his head and becomes the messiah of "Let's Go Sexin'!"

Cast

Production
John Waters decided to make the film after discovering several sexual slang terms and branches existed on the internet, explaining the groups and terminology found in the film. The film was shot entirely on-location in Baltimore on Harford Road which is prominently featured in the film. In a featurette on the DVD veteran stage actress Suzanne Shepherd recalled that when she was cast as Big Ethel, she was completely unfamiliar with Waters' work and she had no idea what to expect when she showed up for the first script review. Horrified by what she was reading, she became so distraught that she began to cry. She tried to quit the project but Waters and her cast mates managed to persuade her to stay. Paul Giamatti was originally slated to play Vaughn Stickles, but dropped out before filming began.

The film received an NC-17 rating from the Motion Picture Association of America (MPAA). Many major theater chains will not screen a film with that rating, and many media outlets limit or refuse advertising for NC-17-rated films, thus severely limiting distribution. When Waters asked what he would need to cut for them to give his film an R rating, he was told that the ratings board "stopped taking notes." After Waters unsuccessfully attempted to appeal the rating, the film was released with the NC-17 classification.

Reception
A Dirty Shame received mixed reviews from critics, with its unashamed vulgarity being both lauded and lampooned. On the review aggregator website Rotten Tomatoes, the film holds an approval rating of 53% based on 117 reviews, with an average rating of 5.6/10. The website's critics consensus reads, "John Waters casts his provocative eye towards libido in a sex satire that won't leave audiences feeling too Dirty, but this sophomoric farce doesn't strike a nerve like his best work – a real Shame." On Metacritic, the film has a weighted average score of 56 out of 100, based on 34 critics, indicating "mixed or average reviews".

One of the more positive reviews came from Kevin Thomas of the Los Angeles Times, who wrote

A gross-out pioneer, Waters has always had more on his mind than delirious, sex-crazed silliness. By allowing people to speak freely about their sexual urges and practices with a bluntness that is jaw-droppingly hilarious, Waters has drawn deeply upon comedy's liberating power. The more the sex addicts talk about their hang-ups the more comically harmless they seem, and thus it's all the more absurd for the puritanical to try to punish them for their various pursuits of pleasure.

Waters has always harnessed poor taste to lampoon attempts to limit freedom of expression. This raucously gritty and high-spirited film could scarcely be bluer in terms of the language, but from Waters it comes as a gust of fresh air.

Also enthusiastic was Peter Travers of Rolling Stone, who wrote

A Dirty Shame is Waters unleashed, and wicked, kinky fun for anyone except the twits who rated it NC-17...You may even shed a tear when Sylvia bonds with her daughter by confessing, "I'm a cunnilingus bottom." OK, the jokes are hit-and-miss and the plot is nonexistent, but the Waters spirit stays consistently and sweetly twisted. When the cast takes to the streets singing, "Let's go sexin'", you want to cheer them on.

On the other end of the spectrum was Roger Ebert, who gave the film one star out of a possible four, elaborating

There is in show biz something known as "a bad laugh". That's the laugh you don't want to get, because it indicates not amusement but incredulity, nervousness or disapproval. John Waters' A Dirty Shame is the only comedy I can think of that gets more bad laughs than good ones...We go to a Waters film expecting bad taste, but we also expect to laugh, and A Dirty Shame is monotonous, repetitive and sometimes wildly wrong in what it hopes is funny.

Box office
A Dirty Shame opened on September 17, 2004, on one Baltimore screen to $29,384. The next weekend, it expanded to 133 venues, where it grossed $448,914 ($3,375 per screen). It ended its North American run with $1,339,668. Overseas, the film earned an additional $574,498 (as of July 14, 2005), making its global box office total come to $1.9 million.

Home media

The film was released on DVD on June 14, 2005. There is both a full uncensored(original/ higher than R) version and an edited, R-rated cut sold through Blockbuster, Wal-Mart and Best Buy as well as Target dubbed "The Neuter Version". The R-rated version is heavily censored and removes most of the profanities including altered dialogue such as "sex toy". Additionally, a scene in which two characters stand naked in their doorway is replaced by one in which the characters are clothed. In an interview, Waters stated that this version is "essentially for brainless people and 'really weird collectors'".

Netflix claimed to stream the NC-17 version but for a time, it was the censored version. It has since replaced it with the uncensored cut. A heavily censored version aired on LOGO, a cable channel for gay interest. Despite several internet sites and even the spine of the DVD stating that it is "The Neuter Version", the Australian release of the film is the NC-17 version with all profanity and nudity intact. It is rated R18+ for "sexual references and adult themes".

References

External links

 
 
 
 
 

2004 films
2004 comedy films
2004 LGBT-related films
2000s American films
2000s English-language films
2000s satirical films
2000s sex comedy films
American LGBT-related films
American satirical films
American sex comedy films
Bisexuality-related films
Films about sex addiction
Films about sexual repression
Films directed by John Waters
Films produced by Christine Vachon
Films scored by George S. Clinton
Films set in Baltimore
Films shot in Baltimore
Killer Films films
LGBT-related satirical films
LGBT-related sex comedy films
Lesbian-related films
Rating controversies in film